Alec Joseph Ryncavage (born March 27, 2001) is an American businessman and politician. He is a Republican member of the Pennsylvania House of Representatives, representing the 119th District since 2023. Ryncavage became the first Republican to represent the district since its creation in 1968.

Early life and career
Ryncavage was born on March 27, 2001, in Pennsylvania. He was raised Catholic. While still in junior high school, Ryncavage became a freelance web developer, creating his own anti-virus software at age 14. He later founded his own cybersecurity company, CYBIOT. 

Ryncavage graduated from Wyoming Valley West High School in 2019.

Political career
In 2019, Ryncavage ran for a seat on the Borough Council of Plymouth, Pennsylvania and won, becoming at age 18 the youngest person ever elected to the council.

In 2022, Ryncavage announced his intention to run for Pennsylvania State Representative from the 119th District, to replace retiring State Representative Gerald Mullery. He won the Republican primary election, and went on to defeat Democrat Vito Malacari in the general election. At 21 years of age, Ryncavage is the youngest member of the Pennsylvania House of Representatives.

Political positions

Abortion
Ryncavage describes himself as "personally pro-life", but according to himself, has "never supported an outright ban on abortion." He supports exceptions to abortion bans for rape, incest, and protecting the life of the mother. Ryncavage opposes late-term abortions and taxpayer-funded abortions.

Criminal justice and policing
In 2022, Ryncavage supported the passage of the Officer John Wilding Law, which made it a felony should bodily harm come to a law enforcement officer as a result of a suspect fleeing arrest.

Ryncavage opposes defunding the police.

Elections
Ryncavage supports voter ID, and supports banning no-excuse mail-in ballots.

Environmental policy
Ryncavage opposes the Regional Greenhouse Gas Initiative (RGGI), and is against banning natural gas.

Gun rights
Ryncavage supports constitutional carry, and is a member of the National Rifle Association (NRA).

Taxation
Ryncavage supports the elimination of property taxes.

Electoral history

References 

Living people
Republican Party members of the Pennsylvania House of Representatives
21st-century American politicians
2001 births
People from Plymouth, Pennsylvania
Businesspeople from Pennsylvania